Steen Fladberg is a retired male badminton player from Denmark, noted for his speed of foot, who excelled during the 1980s. Though a strong international level singles player, his biggest achievements came in doubles.

Career
Fladberg won the gold medal at the 1983 IBF World Championships in men's doubles with Jesper Helledie, defeating Mike Tredgett and Martin Dew 15–10, 15–10 in the final. He was a silver medalist at the same tournament in mixed doubles with Pia Nielsen.

He also won at the 1986 European Badminton Championships in men's doubles with Helledie, and the 1988 European Badminton Championships in mixed doubles with England's Gillian Clark.  Fladberg and Clark are currently a commentary team for televised badminton.

Personal information
He married the former Danish badminton player Kirsten Larsen. Their son Rasmus Fladberg is also a professional badminton player.

Major achievements

World Championships 
Men's doubles

IBF World Grand Prix 
The World Badminton Grand Prix sanctioned by International Badminton Federation (IBF) from 1983 to 2006.

Men's doubles

References

External links
Steen Fladberg's Profile - Badminton.dk

1956 births
Living people
Danish male badminton players